Love Is Not a Sin (French: L'amour n'est pas un pêché) is a 1952 French comedy film directed by Claude Cariven and starring Robert Dhéry, Colette Brosset and Louis de Funès. It was shot at the Billancourt Studios in Paris. The film's sets were designed by the art director Raymond Gabutti.

Synopsis
A leader of a anti-female organisation and a feminist live next door and quarrel violently. Eventually they will end up reconciling.

Cast 
 Robert Dhéry as Jacques Loursier, president of the l'U.R.A.F
 Colette Brosset as Eliane Cahuzac, chairwoman of the l'A.P.T.I.D.L.F
 Maryse Martin as the concierge of the building
 Paul Demange as a tenant
 André Chanu as the commander Durmel
 Jacques Legras as Mr Vaugerel, member of the association
 Roger Saget as a mover
 Pierre Duncan as a mover
 Guy Henry as a mover
 Gérard Darrieu as a mover
 Jacky Blanchot as a mover
 Verlor et Davril as the singers of the restaurant
 Mario David as the agent in the staircase
 Louis de Funès as Mr Cottin, member of the U.R.A.F

References

Bibliography
 Dicale, Bertrand. Louis de Funès, grimaces et gloire. Grasset, 2009.

External links 
 
 L’Amour n’est pas un péché (1952) at the Films de France

1952 films
French comedy films
1950s French-language films
French black-and-white films
1952 comedy films
Films shot at Billancourt Studios
1950s French films